The 1996–97 season was Port Vale's 85th season of football in the English Football League, and third successive season in the First Division. John Rudge led the club to its joint-second highest ever league finish, as Vale finished in eighth spot, four points from the play-offs. Vale exited both the FA Cup and the League Cup at the Third Round.

Overview

First Division
The pre-season saw John Rudge sign forward Justin O'Reilly from non-league Gresley Rovers for a £30,000 fee.

The season started poorly, with just two wins in the opening thirteen games, and protests began to develop against Chairman Bill Bell and his selling policy. A decent October, with wins over Wolverhampton Wanderers at Molineux and Birmingham City at home, was followed by a winless November – in which midfielder Jan Jansson became the first Swede to play for the club, when he arrived on loan from IFK Norrköping. A run of four consecutive victories in December showed the squad's potential however. Tony Naylor put a hat-trick past Charlton Athletic in a 3–1 win at The Valley on 14 December. The following week Vale pulled Norwich City apart in a 6–1 win – Martin Foyle and Stewart Talbot both claiming braces, before the run was topped off with a 1–0 win over Manchester City in front of over 30,000 people at Maine Road. Meanwhile, O'Reilly was loaned out to Macclesfield Town to gain experience. Vale's form tailed off, and on 19 January they managed to go from 4–0 up against Queens Park Rangers at half-time to finish the game drawn 4–4. In February, Rudge spent £75,000 to bring Dutch midfielder Rogier Koordes in from Telstar. However he had to suffer the departure of winger Steve Guppy, who was sold to top-flight Leicester City for £850,000. Despite the loss, the "Valiants" marched on, as a late spurt of form saw them win four straight games to stand a great chance of reaching the play-offs with just three games to go. In April, O'Reilly was moved on to Southport, having not appeared in the Vale first team. Rivals Stoke City managed to dampen Vale's hopes by easing to a 2–0 victory at the Victoria Ground. More damaging though was the defeat at home to Wolves and a final day draw with eventual play-off winners Crystal Palace at Selhurst Park.

They finished eighth with 67 points (a mere four points off Palace in the play-offs), representing their highest finish since 1933–34. They finished three points and four places higher than Stoke.

At the end of the season, legendary midfielder Ray Walker ended his nine years association with the club, becoming a player-coach with non-league Leek Town. Another popular player's Vale career was just starting however, with Jan Jansson signing permanently for a £200,000 fee.

Finances
The club's shirt sponsors were Tunstall Assurance.

Cup competitions
In the FA Cup, Premier League Blackburn Rovers proved to be too strong, as Vale left Ewood Park having suffered a 1–0 defeat.

In the League Cup, nearby Second Division side Crewe Alexandra lost 1–0 at Vale Park, before Vale blasted them away with a 5–1 win at Gresty Road. They then advanced past Third Division Carlisle United with a 3–2 aggregate victory. Pitted against Oxford United in the Third Round, a 2–0 defeat at the Manor Ground meant Vale were out of the competition.

League table

Results
Port Vale's score comes first

Football League First Division

Results by matchday

Matches

FA Cup

League Cup

Player statistics

Appearances

Top scorers

Transfers

Transfers in

Transfers out

Loans in

Loans out

References
Specific

General
Soccerbase

Port Vale F.C. seasons
Port Vale